Descendants of Smith is the fourteenth studio album by Roy Harper, released in 1988. In 1994 it was re-issued under the title, Garden of Uranium with an identical track list but new cover artwork.

History

As a publicity stunt on the music media, whom Harper thought did not give him or his music fair or considered reviews, Harper sent out 3 promo versions of his single "Laughing Inside" using anagrams of his own name; 'Per Yarroh' a Norwegian classical avant garde composer, 'Rory Phare' a lounge lizard and trendy art designer and 'Harry Rope' a Hells Angel. Music magazines were sent the 7" single, along with an accompanying fake biography describing the artist they were being introduced to.

An employee from Sounds interviewed Per Yarroh and apparently fell for the publicity stunt "hook, line and sinker". When interviewed, Harper elaborated; "as she wrote up the interview in the office, an old timer heard the record and asked what she was doing on Roy Harper? She'd loved the record originally, but then turned right around and wrote the most vindictive piece about me. I also had loads of radio lined up, but as soon as they found out it was me they all cancelled. Being called Roy Harper is the biggest artistic drawback in my career."

Track listing
All tracks credited to Roy Harper, except Laughing Inside - Roy Harper/Nick Harper

Side one
"Laughing Inside" – 4:15
"Garden of Uranium" – 4:03
"Still Life" – 4:47
"Pinches of Salt" – 3:07
"Desert Island" – 4:20

Side two
"Government Surplus" – 2:21
"Surplus Liquorice" – 0:39
"Liquorice Alltime" – 3:43
"Maile Lei" – 4:34
"Same Shoes" – 4:15
"Descendants of Smith" – 3:49

CD bonus track
"Laughing Inside (Rough and Ready version)" – 4:10

Personnel 
Roy Harper – guitar and vocals
 Jacqui Turner – sound engineer
 Stuart Elliot
 Tony Franklin
 Nik Green
 Nick Harper
 Kevin McAlea – keyboards and alto saxophone
 Mark Ramsden

References

External links 
 Roy Harper official site
 Excellent Roy Harper resource

Roy Harper (singer) albums
1988 albums
EMI Records albums